This is a list of Cambodia's 162 districts ( srok), 27 district-level municipalities ( krong) and 14 sections ( khan) organized by each province and an autonomous municipality (Phnom Penh). Each has a code in parentheses displaying the first two digits as the province and the last two representing that province.

Banteay Meanchey
 Mongkol Borei (01-02)
 Phnom Srok (01-03)
 Preah Netr Preah (01-04)
 Ou Chrov (01-05)
 Serei Saophoan municipality (01-06)
 Thma Puok (01-07)
 Svay Chek (01-08)
 Malai (01-09)
 Poipet municipality (01-10)

Battambang
 Banan (02-01)
 Thma Koul (02-02)
 Battambang municipality (02-03)
 Bavel (02-04)
 Ek Phnom (02-05)
 Moung Ruessei (02-06)
 Rotanak Mondol (02-07)
 Sangkae (02-08)
 Samlout (02-09)
 Sampov Loun (02-10)
 Phnum Proek (02-11)
 Kamrieng (02-12)
 Koas Krala (02-13)
 Rukhak Kiri (02-14)

Kampong Cham
 Batheay (03-01)
 Chamkar Leu (03-02)
 Cheung Prey (03-03)
 Kampong Cham municipality (03-05)
 Kampong Siem (03-06)
 Kang Meas (03-07)
 Koh Sotin (03-08)
 Prey Chhor (03-13)
 Srey Santhor (03-14)
 Stueng Trang (03-15)

Kampong Chhnang
 Baribour (04-01)
 Chol Kiri (04-02)
 Kampong Chhnang municipality (04-03)
 Kampong Leaeng (04-04)
 Kampong Tralach (04-05)
 Rolea B'ier (04-06)
 Sameakki Mean Chey (04-07)
 Tuek Phos (04-08)

Kampong Speu
 Basedth (05-01)
 Chbar Mon municipality (05-02)
 Kong Pisei (05-03)
 Aoral (05-04)
 Odongk (05-05)
 Phnom Sruoch (05-06)
 Samraong Tong (05-07)
 Thpong (05-08)

Kampong Thom
 Baray (06-01)
 Kampong Svay (06-02)
 Stueng Saen municipality (06-03)
 Prasat Balangk (06-04)
 Prasat Sambour (06-05)
 Sandaan (06-06)
 Santuk (06-07)
 Stoung (06-08)
 Taing Kouk (06-09)

Kampot
 Angkor Chey (07-01)
 Banteay Meas (07-02)
 Chhuk (07-03)
 Chum Kiri (07-04)
 Dang Tong (07-05)
 Kampong Trach (07-06)
 Tuek Chhou (07-07)
 Kampot municipality (07-08)

Kandal
 Kandal Stueng (08-01)
 Kien Svay (08-02)
 Khsach Kandal (08-03)
 Kaoh Thum (08-04)
 Leuk Daek (08-05)
 Lvea Aem (08-06)
 Mukh Kampul (08-07)
 Angk Snuol (08-08)
 Ponhea Lueu (08-09)
 S'ang (08-10)
 Ta Khmau municipality (08-11)

Kep
 Damnak Chang'aeur (23-01)
 Kep municipality (23-02)

Koh Kong
 Botum Sakor (09-01)
 Kiri Sakor (09-02)
 Khemara Phoumin municipality (09-03)
 Smach Mean Chey (09-04)
 Mondol Seima (09-05)
 Srae Ambel (09-06)
 Thma Bang (09-07)

Kratié
 Chhloung (10-01)
 Kratié municipality (10-02)
 Preaek Prasab (10-03)
 Sambour (10-04)
 Snuol (10-05)
 Chetr Borei (10-06)

Mondulkiri
 Kaev Seima (11-01)
 Kaoh Nheaek (11-02)
 Ou Reang (11-03)
 Pechr Chenda (11-04)
 Saen Monourom municipality (11-05)

Oddar Meanchey
 Anlong Veaeng (22-01)
 Banteay Ampil (22-02)
 Chong Kal (22-03)
 Samraong municipality (22-04)
 Trapeang Prasat (22-05)

Pailin
 Pailin municipality (24-01)
 Sala Krau (24-02)

Phnom Penh (autonomous municipality)
 Chamkar Mon (12-01)
 Daun Penh (12-02)
 Prampir Makara (12-03)
 Tuol Kouk (12-04)
 Dangkao (12-05)
 Mean Chey (12-06)
 Russey Keo (12-07)
 Sen Sok (12-08)
 Pou Senchey (12-09)
 Chroy Changvar (12-10)
 Prek Pnov (12-11)
 Chbar Ampov (12-12)
 Boeng Keng Kang (12-13)
 Kamboul (12-14)

Preah Vihear
 Chey Saen (13-01)
 Chhaeb (13-02)
 Choam Khsant (13-03)
 Kuleaen (13-04)
 Rovieng (13-05)
Sangkum Thmei (13-06)
 Tbaeng Mean Chey (13-07)
  Preah Vihear municipality (13-08)

Pursat
 Bakan (15-01)
 Kandieng (15-02)
 Krakor (15-03)
 Phnum Kravanh (15-04)
 Pursat municipality (15-05)
 Veal Veaeng (15-06)
 Talou Sen Chey (15-07)

Prey Veng
 Ba Phnum (14-01)
 Kamchay Mear (14-02)
 Kampong Trabaek (14-03)
 Kanhchriech (14-04)
 Me Sang (14-05)
 Peam Chor (14-06)
 Peam Ro (14-07)
 Pea Reang (14-08)
 Preah Sdach (14-09)
 Prey Veaeng municipality (14-10)
 Pou Rieng (14-11)
 Sithor Kandal (14-12)
 Svay Antor (14-13)

Ratanakiri  
 Andoung Meas (16-01)
 Banlung municipality (16-02)
 Bar Kaev (16-03)
 Koun Mom (16-04)
 Lumphat (16-05)
 Ou Chum (16-06)
 Ou Ya Dav (16-07)
 Ta Veaeng (16-08)
 Veun Sai (16-09)

Siem Reap
 Angkor Chum (17-01)
 Angkor Thom (17-02)
 Banteay Srei (17-03)
 Chi Kraeng (17-04)
 Kralanh (17-06)
 Puok (17-07)
 Prasat Bakong (17-09)
 Siem Reap municipality (17-10)
 Sout Nikom (17-11)
 Srei Snam (17-12)
 Svay Leu (17-13)
 Varin (17-14)

Sihanoukville
 Preah Sihanouk municipality (18-01)
 Prey Nob (18-02)
 Stueng Hav (18-03)
 Kampong Seila (18-04)
 Koh Rong (18-05)

Stung Treng
 Sesan (19-01)
 Siem Bouk (19-02)
 Siem Pang (19-03)
 Stung Treng municipality (19-04)
 Thala Barivat (19-05)
Borei O'Svay Sen Chey (19-06)

Svay Rieng
 Chantrea (20-01)
 Kampong Rou (20-02)
 Rumduol (20-03)
 Romeas Haek (20-04)
 Svay Chrum (20-05)
 Svay Rieng municipality (20-06)
 Svay Teab (20-07)
 Bavet municipality (20-08)

Takéo
 Angkor Borei (21-01)
 Bati (21-02)
 Bourei Cholsar (21-03)
 Kiri Vong (21-04)
 Kaoh Andaet (21-05)
 Prey Kabbas (21-06)
 Samraong (21-07)
 Doun Kaev municipality (21-08)
 Tram Kak (21-09)
 Treang (21-10)

Tboung Khmum
 Dambae (25-01)
 Krouch Chhmar (25-02)
 Memot (25-03)
 Ou Reang Ov (25-04)
 Ponhea Kraek (25-05)
 Suong municipality (25-06)
 Tboung Khmum (25-07)

References

External links 
 
 

 
Districts
Cambodia 2
Districts, Cambodia